ABC Sport, formerly ABC Radio Grandstand, is a live radio sports focused commentary and talk-back program which runs on the Australian Broadcasting Corporation (ABC) local radio network across Australia and on one digital-only station.

History
From the first week in November 2020, the ABC rebranded all of its sports coverage as "ABC SPORT", renaming the ABC Grandstand on digital radio as well as its social media accounts to this name.

Description
Sports that covered by the station include Test, Twenty20 and One-Day International cricket (live), rugby league (mostly in Queensland and New South Wales), the Summer Olympics, Australian Football League games, Australian Open tennis and soccer matches, including games involving the Socceroos and the A-League competition.

Programming

Grandstand cricket
ABC Grandstand has been broadcasting cricket since the 1930, and is the only national Australian radio station to broadcast live Test, One Day and domestic cricket.

The lead ABC cricket commentators are as follows:
 Jim Maxwell - A highly experienced and highly regarded cricket commentator, Maxwell has covered Australian One-Day, Test, and World Cup matches. He also has broadcast rugby union, rugby league, golf, and hockey, and Olympic Games.
 Ian Chappell - Former captain of Australia. He has played over 90 Test and One Day cricket matches for Australia and has a Test batting average of 42.42.
 Alison Mitchell - Commentator of Channel 7's cricket coverage since 2018, first joined the ABC in 2014. She has also covered the Olympic Games, Commonwealth Games and four Women's Cricket World Cups.

Other notable callers include Andrew Moore, Kristen Beams, Dirk Nannes, and Stuart Clark.

Grandstand rugby league
Grandstand Rugby League is the ABC's flagship NRL programme in the northern states.  The programme calls every game live each week of the season including the State of Origin series and Finals with in depth previews and reviews, analysis, extensive talkback and interviews, and live score updates of other matches.

Grandstand AFL
Grandstand AFL is ABC's flagship sports programme in the southern states. The programme calls six AFL games live a week with further match preview, analysis, and talkback of the game. An introduction in 2008 was the Sunday Inquisition with Gerard Whateley highlighting the good and the bad of the AFL games for the past week. Coverage preference is given to local teams in their state. National coverage for games outside the home state is determined by the match with the highest appeal.

Commentators: Quentin Hull, Rob Cross, Peter Walsh, Clint Wheeldon, Corbin Middlemas, Adam White, Matt Clinch, David Parkin, Jon Dorotich, Kelli Underwood, Stan Alves, Mark Maclure

Grandstand A-League
Beginning in the 2013/14 season, ABC Grandstand began covering every match of the A-League live on either local radio, digital radio, or via a dedicated mobile app.

Presenters

Simone Thurtell

Simone Thurtell was a presenter for Grandstand. She formerly shared the hosting of the summer Grandstand program with others, including Karen Tighe, Tracy Holmes and Peter Walsh. She was ABC's around-the-ground reporter during international cricket matches played at the SCG. She is probably best known for her Grandstand Active Show, which featured regular guests, including Kerry O'Keeffe, Geoff Huegill and Al Baxter, and covered the sporting issues of the day, overnight scores and live crosses to sport.

Thurtell initially worked for ABC TV Sport, before switching into the ABC Radio Grandstand team. She covered major events such as the 2000 Sydney Olympics and 2006 Commonwealth Games in New Delhi. She called many sports, particularly netball. She presented Drive on 1233 ABC Newcastle in 2007 and 2008, before returning to Grandstand in 2009.

References

External links

Australian Broadcasting Corporation radio programs
Sports radio in Australia
English-language radio programs
Sports radio programs